Pacifica is a studio album by English guitarist, composer and improvisor Fred Frith. It was composed by Frith in 1994 as "a meditation for 21 musicians with texts by Pablo Neruda", and was performed, under the direction of Frith, by the Bolognese Eva Kant ensemble in 1995 in Modena, Italy. Texts, taken from the Chilean poet Pablo Neruda's works, were recorded by Sergio Meza in September 1997 in Santiago, Chile and were added to the music in 1998. The album was released on Tzadik Records' Composer Series in 1998.

Frith does not perform on this album.

Background
Pacifica was composed by Frith at Big Sur, California in a cabin overlooking the Pacific Ocean. It is "a slow meditation on life and death"  and reflects a series of events that occurred in Frith's life at the time, namely the death of two close friends and the birth of his daughter.

Pacifica was composed for an ensemble that included prepared guitars, wind instruments, percussion, a vocalist and a performer on records, CDs and tapes. The 19 member Eva Kant ensemble (named after a 1960s comic strip heroine, Eva Kant) performed the piece, with fragments of recited text from the Death Song of the Cupeño tribe of California and the tribal names of all the original inhabitants of California. The recording was supplemented later with texts from Pablo Neruda's Soneto IX and Cien sonetos de amor, read by Sergio Meza.

Track listing
All tracks composed by Fred Frith.

Personnel
Eva Kant ensemble
Margareth Kammerer – voice
Stefano Zorzanello – flute, piccolo, soprano saxophone
Daniella Cattivelli – alto saxophone
Olivia Bignardi – clarinet, bass clarinet
Silvia Fanti – accordion
Salvatore Panu – trombone
Giorgio Simbola – trombone
Ferdinando d'Andria – trumpet, violin
Pierangelo Galantino – violin, double bass
Lelio Giannetto – double bass
Claudio Lanteri – prepared guitar
Paolo Angeli – prepared guitar
Massimo Simonini – records, CDs, tapes
Filomena Forleo – piano
Nicola Zonca – marimba
Tiziano Popoli – keyboards
Andrea Martignoni – percussion
Mario Martignoni – percussion
Pino Urso – percussion
Sergio Meza – reading texts by Pablo Neruda

Sound
Eva Kant ensemble recorded by Davide Sandri at Centro Musica, Modena, Italy, July 1995
Sergio Meza recorded by Carlos Gabezas at Studio Constantinople, Santiago, Chile, September 1997
Mixed by Peter Hardt at Studio Jankowski, Stuttgart, Germany, February 1998
Mastered by Allan Tucker at Foothill Digital, New York City, United States.

References

1998 albums
Fred Frith albums
Tzadik Records albums
Albums produced by Fred Frith
Cultural depictions of Pablo Neruda